Brunstane is a railway station on the Borders Railway, which runs between  and . It is owned by Network Rail and managed by ScotRail.

History
The station was opened by Railtrack on 3 June 2002, as part of the Edinburgh Crossrail.

Services

As of the May 2021 timetable change, the station is served by an hourly service between Edinburgh Waverley and Tweedbank, with a half-hourly service operating at peak times (Monday to Saturday). Some peak time trains continue to Glenrothes with Thornton. All services are operated by ScotRail.

Rolling stock used: Class 158 Express Sprinter and Class 170 Turbostar

References

External links 
 
 

Railway stations in Edinburgh
Railway stations opened by Railtrack
Railway stations in Great Britain opened in 2002
Railway stations served by ScotRail
2002 establishments in Scotland
Borders Railway